Bogdan is a given name of Slavic origin and a surname.

Bogdan may also refer to:

Geography and places
 Boğdan, alternate Turkish name for Moldavia, a region and former principality in Europe
 Bogdan (peak), in the Sredna Gora mountain range in Bulgaria
 Bohdan, Podlaskie Voivodeship, a village in the northeastern Poland

Business
 Bogdan group, an automobile manufacturer in Ukraine that specializes in producing buses
 Bogdan (bus model)

See also
 Bohdan (disambiguation)